Tom Wilkerson Bonner (19 October 1910, Greenville, Texas – 6 December 1961 Houston, Texas) was an American experimental physicist who developed important instruments and techniques for neutron physics and nuclear physics (Bonner sphere).

Biography
Bonner earned his bachelor's degree in physics from SMU in 1931 and his PhD from Rice University in 1934. In 1934–1936, he was a National Research Council fellow at Caltech. At Rice University, he became an instructor in 1936, a professor in 1945, and chair of the physics department in 1947. In the academic year 1938–1939, he was a Guggenheim fellow. He was elected a Fellow of the American Physical Society in 1941. From 1941 to 1946, he did radar research at the MIT Radiation Lab. Bonner was an associate editor of the Review of Scientific Instruments in 1946–1949 and in 1952–1955. He was an associate editor of Physical Review from 1951 until his death. In 1959, he was elected a member of the National Academy of Sciences. In 1964, the Tom W. Bonner Prize in Nuclear Physics was established in his memory.

He did important work in the development of high-pressure cloud chambers for the study of neutrons produced by accelerators. He invented a neutron-counter-ratio technique for the determination of neutron emission thresholds. He also invented a sphere-moderated neutron spectrometer.

In 1937, he married Jara Prasilova; they had three children. On 6 December 1961, at the age of 51 Bonner died in Houston, Texas of acute myocardial infarction.

Patents and publications
Bonner, T. W., & Brubaker, W. M. (1936). The disintegration of nitrogen by neutrons. Physical Review. 49(3): 223. 
Bent, R. D., T. W. Bonner, and R. F. Sippel. (1955). "Pair Spectrometer Measurements of the Radiations from Excited States of Light Nuceli." Physical Review. 98(5): 1237. 
Bent, R. D., T. W. Bonner, J. H. McCrary, W. A. Ranken, and R. F. Sippel. (1955). "Gamma Rays from the Deuteron Bombardment of Be9, B10, N14, and F19." Physical Review. 99(3): 710.
Taylor, H. L., Lönsjö, O., & Bonner, T. W. (1955). Nonelastic scattering cross sections for fast neutrons. Physical Review. 100(1): 174. 
Bonner, T. W., and J. C. Slattery. (1959). "Nonelastic Scattering Cross Section for 8-20 Mev Neutrons." Physical Review. 113(4): 1088. 
Bramblett, Richard L., Ewing, Ronald I., & Bonner, T. W. (1960). A new type of neutron spectrometer. Nuclear Instruments and Methods, 9(1), 1-12. 
Bonner, T. W. (1961). Measurements of neutron spectra from fission. Nuclear Physics. 23, 116–121. 
Caldwell, R. L., & Bonner, T. W. (1961). Measurement of gamma ray energy due to inelastic neutron scattering. (No. GB 862434).
Romain, F. S., Bonner, T. W., Bramblett, R. L., & Hanna, J. (1962). Low-Energy Neutrons from the Reaction Be 9 (α, n) C 12. Physical Review. 126(5): 1794.
Bonner, T. W., & Mills, J. W. R. (1967). Semiconductor radiation detector for use in nuclear well logging. U.S. Patent No. 3,312,823. Washington, DC: U.S. Patent and Trademark Office.

References

External links
Bonner Book Awards, Rice University Physics & Astronomy Department

1910 births
1961 deaths
20th-century American physicists
American nuclear physicists
Members of the United States National Academy of Sciences
People from Greenville, Texas
Rice University alumni
Rice University faculty
Southern Methodist University alumni
20th-century American inventors
Fellows of the American Physical Society
California Institute of Technology fellows